Tonia Buxton is a British television presenter, restaurateur and author of Greek Cypriot descent. She is the host of the Discovery Channel Travel & Living series My Greek Kitchen and My Cypriot Kitchen.

Buxton lives in north London, with her husband Paul and their four children. They have been married since September 1996. One of her daughters, Antigoni, took part in Season 8 of the British reality TV show Love Island.

In 2016, Buxton released her cookery book The Real Greek. She commented to Ikon London Magazine: "We have a lot of customers who ask recipes of (The Real Greek) restaurant dishes so that they can prepare them at home. So we decided to share our trade secrets."

She is an opponent of lockdowns and restrictions relating to COVID-19 and regularly appears as a guest on The Independent Republic of Mike Graham show on TalkRadio to commentate on these issues.

Buxton has appeared as a commentator and presenter on GB News.

Books 
 Have a Baby and Look Better Than Ever: An Holistic Guide to Health and Fitness (2000)
 Tonia's Greek Kitchen: Travels through 'My Greek Kitchen' and 'My Cypriot Kitchen''' (2012)
 Eat Greek for a Week (2015)
 The Real Greek (2016)
 The Secret of Spice'' (2019)

References

External links
Tonia Buxton web site

1968 births
Living people
British television presenters
British people of Greek Cypriot descent
Women cookbook writers
British chefs
British women television presenters